Jugtown is an unincorporated community and census-designated place (CDP) in Blair County, Pennsylvania, United States. It was first listed as a CDP prior to the 2020 census.

The CDP is in southeastern Blair County, in the southwestern corner of Huston Township. It sits at the southern foot of Lock Mountain, part of the western edge of Morrisons Cove.

Demographics

References 

Census-designated places in Blair County, Pennsylvania
Census-designated places in Pennsylvania